Davor Janjić (18 November 1969 – 28 November 2022) was a Bosnian actor. He appeared in more than thirty films since 1987.

Janjić died on 28 November 2022, at the age of 53.

Selected filmography

References

External links 

1969 births
2022 deaths
Actors from Tuzla
Yugoslav male actors
Bosnia and Herzegovina male film actors
20th-century Bosnia and Herzegovina male actors
21st-century Bosnia and Herzegovina male actors